Norris Thomas (born May 3, 1954) is a former professional American football cornerback who played nine seasons in the National Football League (NFL) for the Miami Dolphins and the Tampa Bay Buccaneers. He was inducted into the Pascagoula Athletic Hall of Fame in 2016.

References

1954 births
Living people
People from Inverness, Mississippi
American football cornerbacks
Miami Dolphins players
Tampa Bay Buccaneers players
Southern Miss Golden Eagles football players